"Holding Back the Years" is a song by British soul and pop band Simply Red, released as the third single from their debut studio album, Picture Book (1985). It reached number one on the US Billboard Hot 100 and number two on the UK Singles Chart. It is one of two Simply Red songs (the other being their cover of "If You Don't Know Me by Now") to reach number one in the US. It also reached number four on the Adult Contemporary chart. "Holding Back the Years" had initially been released in the UK the year before, reaching number 51. The song was nominated in the category of Best Pop Performance by a Duo or Group with Vocals at the 29th Annual Grammy Awards.

Background
The group's frontman Mick Hucknall wrote the song when he was 17, while living at his father's house. In a 2018 interview, Hucknall said the song was inspired by a member of the teaching staff at Manchester School of Art, where Hucknall was a fine-art student: the lecturer suggested the greatest paintings are produced when the artist is working in a stream of consciousness, which Hucknall then tried to apply to songwriting – "Holding Back the Years" was the second song he wrote using this method.

The song's writing credits are shared between Hucknall and Neil Moss, a friend and member of Hucknall's first group, the Frantic Elevators. However, according to Hucknall, Moss did not co-write the song, but the credit was added "to remember the great times we had" as the pair had written so many other songs together. The song was first performed by the Frantic Elevators. The song's "I'll keep holding on" chorus was not added until many years later, after the band had split and Hucknall had formed Simply Red.

Hucknall's mother left the family when he was three: the upheaval caused by this event inspired him to write the song. However, according to Hucknall, he did not realise what the song was about until it was finished: he characterised it as a song "about that moment where you know you have to leave home and make your mark, but the outside world is scary. So you’re holding back the years". He said that the line "Strangled by the wishes of pater" was inspired by arguments he had with his father: according to Hucknall, the two clashed often during his teenage years "because there was no woman to act as referee".

Music video
The accompanying music video for "Holding Back the Years" focuses on Mick Hucknall, who, while singing the song, walks through the English countryside and Whitby Abbey carrying luggage and thinking about his childhood memories and the difficult relationship he had with his father. The other members of Simply Red (except for Fritz McIntyre, who plays a one-man band) play local cricketers who greet Hucknall as he passes by. In the last part of the song, Hucknall is seen riding a train, the scenes for which were filmed at and around Goathland railway station on the North Yorkshire Moors Railway.

Charts

Weekly charts

Year-end charts

Certifications

Another Level version

In 1999, English R&B boy band Another Level released their version as a double A-side with a remix of their earlier hit, "Be Alone No More". This release reached No. 11 on the UK Singles Chart.

Track listings
 UK CD1 single
 "Be Alone No More" (C & J Remix) (featuring Jay-Z) - 3:31
 "Holding Back the Years" - 4:18
 "Girl What You Wanna Do" (Full Length Version) - 5:27

 UK CD2 single
 "Holding Back the Years" (Radio Edit) - 4:18
 "Be Alone No More" (Full Intention Radio Edit) - 3:41
 "Be Alone No More" (C & J Remix) - 3:31

References

1985 songs
1985 singles
1986 singles
1999 singles
Simply Red songs
Another Level (band) songs
Billboard Hot 100 number-one singles
Irish Singles Chart number-one singles
Songs written by Mick Hucknall
Songs about heartache
Elektra Records singles
Warner Music Group singles
Pop ballads
1980s ballads